Lew is the surname of:

 Barzillai Lew (1743–1822) African American soldier and musician
 Emma Lew (born 1962), Australian poet
 Harry Lew (1884–1963), American basketball player
 Lew Hing (1858–1934), Chinese-born American industrialist
 Jack Lew (born 1955), United States Secretary of the Treasury
 James Lew (born 1952), American martial arts actor
 Michael Lew (born 1965), Dutch scientist
 Peter Lew (born 1970), Australian businessman, son of Solomon Lew
 Randy Lew (born 1985), American professional poker player
 Ronald S. W. Lew (born 1941), United States District Court judge
 Shoshana Lew, (born 1983), American career government administrator
 Solomon Lew (born 1945), Australian businessman
 Lew Syn Pau, Singaporean politician
 Walter K. Lew, Korean-American poet and scholar
 Lew Yih Wey (born 1991), Malaysian swimmer

See also
 Elizabeth Van Lew (1818-1900), Union spy master during the American Civil War, abolitionist and philanthropist
 Liu, a Chinese surname sometimes spelled Lew
 Yoo (Korean surname), a Korean surname sometimes spelled Lew